Ivan Dobrev Ivanov (born 19 February 1966) is a retired male badminton player from Bulgaria.

Career
Ivanov competed in badminton at the 1992 Summer Olympics in men's singles. He lost in the first round to Deepankar Bhattacharya, of India, with the scores being 15-4, 15-1.

References

Living people
Bulgarian male badminton players
Badminton players at the 1992 Summer Olympics
Olympic badminton players of Bulgaria
1966 births
Sportspeople from Stara Zagora